The 2016–17 Romanian Women's Cup was the 14th edition of Romania's national cup in women's football. Olimpia Cluj won its sixth title through a 5–0 victory over Navobi Iaşi, which qualified for the final for the first time.

Results

Semifinals

Final game

References

Cup women